Evermont Hope Norton (1873–1960) was a business man from Richmond, Virginia.

He was president and chairman of the Ecuadorian Corporation, Ltd. and the International Products Corporation. In 1911 Evermont went to South America as president of the Guayaquil and Quito Railway Company, after an early career as a stockbroker in New York. He developed the Ecuadorian Railroad, which rises from the Pacific Coast city of Guayaquil, over the Andes Mountains to Quito. Evermont graduated in 1895 from the University of Virginia. He started in Wall Street the following year, and until 1899 was senior partner in Norton & Tunstall. He served in Naval Intelligence in World War I. When he later sold his shares of the railway company to the Ecuadorian government he purchased the Guayaquil Brewery (Cervecería de Guayaquil).

He was married several times, one time to Lily Bouvier Morison of Saint Louis, Missouri who was a great aunt of Jackeline Bouvier Kennedy. He was also married to: Marionne Vosburgh (1898–1985), Mary Morrison Carr (1876–1941).

He was the grandfather of the Ecuadorian archeologist Presley Norton Yoder.

References 

20th-century American railroad executives
Businesspeople from Virginia
1873 births
1960 deaths
American expatriates in Ecuador
University of Virginia alumni